Juslisen (pronounced Just Listen) is the second studio album by American singer Musiq Soulchild, simply known at the time as Musiq. It was released on May 7, 2002 under the Def Soul subsidiary of Def Jam Recordings. It debuted at number one on the Billboard 200, where it spent 35 weeks before falling off on February 22, 2003. It was nominated for Best R&B Album at the 2003 Grammy Awards.

Track listing
 Credits adapted from liner notes and Allmusic.

Samples
 "caughtup" contains a sample of "Save Their Souls", as performed by Hamilton Bohannon
 "religious" contains a sample of "Thinking", as performed by The Meters
 "halfcrazy" contains a sample of "Live For Life", as performed by Charlie Byrd
 "intermission: juslisen" contains a sample of "Thank You (Falettinme Be Mice Elf Agin)", as performed by Sly & the Family Stone
 "ifiwouldaknew (girlnextdoor remix)" contains a sample of "Stay with Me", as performed by DeBarge

Personnel
Credits adapted from liner notes and Allmusic.

AAries: featured artist, primary artist, vocals (background)  
Ayinke: vocals (background)  
Donahue Baker: producer  
Ivan "Orthodox" Barias:  producer, arranger, composer, executive producer
Pablo Batista: percussion  
Anthony Bell: engineer, producer  
Junius Bervine: composer, multi instruments  
Jim Bottari: engineer, tracking  
Parris Bowens: keyboards  
Randy Bowland: guitar  
Jeff Bradshaw: trombone  
Leesa Brunson: A&R assistance  
Matt Cappy: flugelhorn  
Troy Corbin: vocals (background)  
Tina Davis: A&R  
Vidal Davis: engineer, multi instruments, producer  
Timothy Day: engineer  
Mark DeBarge: composer  
Vikter Duplaix: composer, guest artist, producer, programming  
Chris Gehringer: mastering  
Serban Ghenea: mixing  
Larry Gold: string arrangements  
Akisia Grigsby: art direction  
Carvin "Ransum" Haggins: composer, executive producer  
Andre Harris: composer, engineer, keyboards, multi instruments, producer  
George Harrison: composer  
Wendell Haskins: fashion stylist

Darren "Limitless" Henson: composer, producer
Ayana Hipps: vocals  
Jerome Hipps: executive producer  
Derrick Hodge: bass  
Jamar Jones: clavinet, fender rhodes, keyboards, organ, wurlitzer  
Kyle "Scratch" Jones : Beatboxing 
Etterlene Jordan: composer  
Francis Lai: composer   
Anthony Mandler: photographer  
Carlos "Storm" Martinez: engineer, tracking  
Michael McArthur: executive producer  
A. Jermaine Mobley: composer, guitar  
Musiq (Soulchild): primary artist, producer 
Jethaniel Nixon: bass  
Keith Pelzer: composer, producer  
Tara Podolsky: A&R  
James Poyser: composer, keyboards, percussion, producer  
Carol Riddick: guest artist, primary artist, vocals  
Eric Roberson: composer, tracking, vocal producer, vocals (background)  
Francesco Romano: arranger, composer, guitar  
Jill Scott: composer  
Jon Smeltz: engineer   
Sylvester Stewart: composer  
Eric Tribett: drums  
Dave Wilson: barber
Hakim Young: producer

Charts

Weekly charts

Year-end charts

Certifications

See also
List of Billboard 200 number-one albums of 2002
List of number-one R&B albums of 2002 (U.S.)

References

Footnotes

2002 albums
Def Jam Recordings albums
Musiq Soulchild albums
Albums produced by 88-Keys